The 2022–23 Pac-12 Conference men's basketball season began with practices in October followed by the 2022–23 NCAA Division I men's basketball season which started on November 7th, 2022. Conference play will begin in December 2022. This will be the eleventh season under the Pac–12 Conference name and the 37th since the conference first sponsored women's sports, including basketball, in the 1986–87 school year.

The Pac-12 tournament will take place in March 2023 at the T-Mobile Arena in Paradise, Nevada.

Pre-season

Recruiting classes

Preseason watchlists
Below is a table of notable preseason watch lists.

Preseason All-American teams

Preseason polls

Pac-12 Media days
The Pac-12 will conduct its 2022 Pac-12 media days at the Pac-12 Studio, in San Francisco, California, on October 26, 2022 on the Pac-12 Network.

The teams and representatives in respective order were as follows:

 Pac-12 Commissioner – George Kliavkoff
 Deputy Commissioner and Chief Operating Officer(MBB) – Jamie Zaninovich
 Arizona – Tommy Lloyd (HC), Kerr Kriisa & Ąžuolas Tubelis
 Arizona State – Bobby Hurley (HC), Marcus Bagley & DJ Horne
 California – Mark Fox (HC), Joel Brown & Lars Thiemann
 Colorado – Tad Boyle (HC), Nique Clifford & Tristan da Silva
 Oregon – Dana Altman (HC), N'Faly Dante & Quincy Guerrier
 Oregon State – Wayne Tinkle (HC), Dexter Akanno & Glenn Taylor Jr.
 Stanford – Jerod Haase (HC), Harrison Ingram & Spencer Jones
 UCLA – Mick Cronin (HC), Tyger Campbell & Jaime Jaquez Jr.
 USC – Andy Enfield (HC), Boogie Ellis & Drew Peterson
 Utah – Craig Smith (HC), Marco Anthony & Branden Carlson
 Washington – Mike Hopkins (HC), Jamal Bey & Keion Brooks
 Washington State – Kyle Smith (HC), TJ Bamba & Mouhamed Gueye

Source:

Pac-12 Preseason All-Conference

First Team

Second Team

Honorable Mention
 Amari Bailey, (UCLA, SG)
 Oumar Ballo, (Arizona, C)
 Jaylen Clark, (UCLA, SF)
 Quincy Guerrier, (Oregon, PF)
 K.J. Simpson, (Colorado, SF)
 Kel’El Ware, (Oregon, C)

Midseason watchlists
Below is a table of notable midseason watch lists.

Final watchlists
Below is a table of notable year end watch lists.

Regular season
The Schedule will be released in late October. Before the season, it was announced that for the seventh consecutive season, all regular season conference games and conference tournament games would be broadcast nationally by ESPN Inc. family of networks including ABC, ESPN, ESPN2 and ESPNU, FOX and FS1, CBS Sports, and the Pac-12 Network.

Early season tournaments

Records against other conferences
Records against non-conference foes for the 2022–23 season. Records shown for regular season only.

Regular Season

Postseason

Record against ranked non-conference opponents
This is a list of games against ranked opponents only (rankings from the AP Poll):

Pac-12/SWAC Legacy Series
On September 20th, 2021 the Pac-12 and Southwestern Athletic Conference will debut the Pac-12/SWAC Legacy Series, an educational and basketball scheduling partnership between the two collegiate athletics conferences, to tip off the 2022-23 season.  The Legacy Series will incorporate an array of educational opportunities for competing teams and student-athletes featuring expert speakers and prominent alumni, community engagement, campus traditions, historic site visits, and book/film discussions.  The two conferences split the series 3−3.

Team rankings are reflective of AP poll when the game was played, not current or final ranking

Conference schedule
This table summarizes the head-to-head results between teams in conference play.

Points scored

Through March 20, 2023

Rankings

*AP does not release post-NCAA Tournament rankings

Head coaches

Coaching changes

Coaches
Note: Stats shown are before the beginning of the season. Pac-12 records are from time at current school.

Notes:
† On March 9, 2023 Cal fired head coach Mark Fox.
 Pac-12 records, conference titles, etc. are from time at current school and are through the end the 2021–22 season.
 NCAA tournament appearances are from time at current school only.
 NCAA Final Fours and Championship include time at other schools.

Post season

Pac-12 tournament

The conference tournament will be played in March 8−11, 2023 at the T-Mobile Arena in Paradise, NV. The top four teams will have a bye on the first day. Teams will be seeded by conference record, with ties broken by record between the tied teams followed by record against the regular-season champion, if necessary.

All-Tournament Team

Most Outstanding Player

NCAA tournament

Four teams from the conference that will be selected to participate: Arizona, Arizona State, UCLA & USC.

National Invitation Tournament 
Three members from the conference that will be selected to participate: Colorado, Oregon & Washington State.

Awards and honors

Players of the Week 
Throughout the regular season, the Pac-12 offices will honor 2 players based on performance by naming them player of the week and freshman of the week.

Totals per School

All-Americans

AP Honorable Mention:

Tyger Campbell, UCLA, Honorable mention (Associated Press)

Sources:
*Associated Press All-America Team
*National Association of Basketball Coaches All-America Team
*Sporting News All-America Team
*USBWA All-America Team

All-District
The United States Basketball Writers Association (USBWA) named the following from the Pac-12 to their All-District Teams:

District VIII

All-District Team

District IX
Player of the Year
Jaime Jaquez Jr., UCLA

All-District Team
 Tyger Campbell, UCLA
 Boogie Ellis, USC 
 Jaime Jaquez Jr., UCLA
 Ąžuolas Tubelis, Arizona

The National Association of Basketball Coaches (NABC) named the following from the Pac-12 to their All-District Teams:

District 19
First Team
 Oumar Ballo, Arizona
 Branden Carlson, Utah
 Boogie Ellis, USC
 Jaime Jaquez Jr., UCLA
 Ąžuolas Tubelis, Arizona

Second Team
 Desmond Cambridge Jr., Arizona State
 Tyger Campbell, UCLA
 N’Faly Dante, Oregon
 Mouhamed Gueye, Washington State
 Drew Peterson, USC

Coach of the Year
Mick Cronin, UCLA

Pac-12 season awards

All-Pac-12

 ‡ Pac-12 Player of the Year
 ††† three-time All-Pac-12 First Team honoree
 †† two-time All-Pac-12 First Team honoree

Honorable Mention
 TJ Bamba, (Washington State, G)
 Adem Bona, (UCLA, F)
 Courtney Ramey, (Arizona, G)
 Will Richardson, (Oregon, G)

All-Freshman Team

‡ Pac-12 Freshman of the Year
Honorable Mention
 Kylan Boswell, (Arizona, G)
 Grant Newell, (California, F)

All-Defensive Team

‡Pac-12 Defensive Player of the Year
†† two-time Pac-12 All-Defensive Team honoree
Honorable Mention
 Marco Anthony, (Utah, G)
 Oumar Ballo, (Arizona, G)
 Mouhamed Gueye, (Washington State, F)
 Warren Washington, (Arizona State, F)

Scholar Athlete of the year
The Pac-12 moved to seasonal Academic Honor Rolls, discontinuing sport-by-sport teams, starting in 2019-20

2022–23 Season statistic leaders
Source:

2023 NBA draft

Home game attendance 

Bold – At or exceed capacity
†Season high

See also
2022–23 Pac-12 Conference women's basketball season

References

2022–23 Pac-12 Conference men's basketball season